Leucopogon fimbriatus is a species of flowering plant in the heath family Ericaceae and is endemic to the south-west of Western Australia. It is a bushy, erect or sprawling shrub with overlapping egg-shaped or oblong leaves and spikes of tube-shaped white flowers on the ends of branches.

Description
The flowers are arranged on the ends of branches in dense spikes of a few flowers with leaf-like bracts and broad, keeled bracteoles at the base.

Taxonomy
Leucopogon fimbriatus was first formally described in 1859 by Sergei Sergeyevich Sheglejev in the Bulletin de la Société impériale des naturalistes de Moscou from specimens collected by James Drummond. The specific epithet (fimbriatus) means "fringed", referring to the leaves.

Distribution and habitat
This leucopogon often grows in sandy soil and occurs in the Avon Wheatbelt, Coolgardie, Esperance Plains, Jarrah Forest and Mallee bioregions of south-western Western Australia.

Conservation status
Leucopogon fimbriatus is listed as "not threatened" by the Government of Western Australia Department of Biodiversity, Conservation and Attractions.

References

fimbriatus
Ericales of Australia
Flora of Western Australia
Plants described in 1859